Łabuńki Drugie  is a village in the administrative district of Gmina Łabunie within Zamość County, Lublin Voivodeship in eastern Poland.

References

Villages in Zamość County